is a railway station on the Yamada Line in the city of Morioka, Iwate, Japan, operated by East Japan Railway Company (JR East).

Lines
Kamimorioka Station is served by the Yamada Line, and is located 2.8 rail kilometers from the terminus of the line at Morioka Station.

Station layout
Kamimorioka Station has a single side platform serving a single bi-directional track. The station is unattended.

History
Kamimorioka Station opened on 10 October 1923. The station was absorbed into the JR East network upon the privatization of the Japanese National Railways (JNR) on 1 April 1987.

Surrounding area
 Iwate Prefectural Office
 Morioka City Hall
 Morioka City Library
Iwate University
Iwate Medical University
  National Route 4
  National Route 46 
  National Route 455

References

External links
  

Railway stations in Iwate Prefecture
Yamada Line (JR East)
Railway stations in Japan opened in 1923
Morioka, Iwate
Stations of East Japan Railway Company